The Wandering Jew's Chronicle is an English broadside ballad dating back to the 17th century, with The Wandering Jew as its narrator. From the point of view of the titular character, this ballad tells the history of the English monarchs, beginning with William the Conqueror, and continuing through King Charles II in early versions, and King George II in later versions. The ballad, according to Giles Bergel, dates back to an initial publication of 1634. Copies of the ballad can be found at the British Library and Magdalene College. Online facsimiles of the text are also available for public consumption.

Synopsis
The ballad, often printed with woodcut illustrations of all the monarchs named, begins with the narrator, the Wandering Jew, declaring that he was fifteen years old when William the Conqueror came to England, and that he can recall and recount with accuracy all that has happened since. He goes on to spend one stanza (sometimes less, sometimes more) telling the story of each subsequent English monarch until the time from which he is narrating. In the case of a few monarchs (Edward I, Henry VII, and Henry VIII, for example) he indicates a more personal knowledge, claiming either to have served in their armies, or as their servants at court. In addition to the monarchs, he names several other figures important to Medieval and Early Modern British monarchical history (see below for examples). The ballad is written in a variation of traditional Ballad Meter, alternating couplets of Iambic tetrameter with single lines of Iambic trimeter, resulting in six-line stanzas with an A-A-B-C-C-B rhyme scheme.

Differences between earlier and later versions of the text
 Earlier versions (dated to the last quarter of the 17th century) ends with the restoration of King Charles II, and a final stanza mentioning Catherine of Braganza, Charles' wife, and offering a blessing of peace and fecundity to them. Later versions, on the other hand (dated to the mid-18th century), eliminates the stanza mentioning Catherine, and continues through the line of English succession up to King George II and his wife, Caroline of Ansbach, concluding with a prayer for the duration of George's rule.
 Earlier versions of the ballad are headed with a list (often illustrated) of all the monarchs cataloged. Later versions contain the same list (and illustrations), but the list on these versions also contains the coronation date and length of rule of each monarch.
 Earlier versions of the ballad have an alternate title, composed of nine rhyming lines of iambic trimeter. Later versions have a shorter, prose alternate title.
 Earlier versions of the ballad describe it as being sung to the title of "Our Prince is welcome out of Spain," another ballad. However, later versions attribute to the song the tune of "The Wandering Jew's Chronicle," suggesting some degree of the ballad's popularity.

Kings and Queens Listed in the Ballad
 William the Conqueror
 William Rufus
 Henry I
 Stephen
 Henry II
 Eleanor of Aquitaine
 Richard I
 John
 Henry III
 Edward I
 Edward II, referred to as Carnarven
 Edward III
 Richard II
 Henry IV
 Henry V
 Henry VI
 Edward IV
 Richard III
 Henry VII
 Henry VIII
 Edward VI
 Mary I
 Elizabeth I
 James I
 Charles I
 Henrietta Maria, referred to as Mary
 Charles II
 Catherine of Braganza (earlier versions only)
 James II (later versions only)
 William III (later versions only)
 Mary II (later versions only)
 Anne (later versions only)
 George I (later versions only)
 George II (later versions only)
 Caroline of Ansbach (later versions only)

Other Important Figures Named
 Simon de Montfort, 6th Earl of Leicester
 Roger Mortimer, 1st Earl of March
 Edward, the Black Prince
 Wat Tyler
 Jack Straw
 Henry Percy (Hotspur)
 Jane Shore

External links
 Facsimiles and Transcriptions of the Ballad at the English Broadside Ballad Archive
 Digitization Project of the ballad

References

1634 works
English folk songs
1630s in England
17th-century songs
Year of song unknown
Songwriter unknown
Fiction about immortality
Historical fiction
Caroline of Ansbach
George II of Great Britain
George I of Great Britain
Cultural depictions of Anne, Queen of Great Britain
Mary II of England
Cultural depictions of William III of England
Cultural depictions of James II of England
Cultural depictions of Catherine of Braganza
Cultural depictions of Charles II of England
Henrietta Maria
Cultural depictions of Charles I of England
Cultural depictions of James VI and I
Cultural depictions of Elizabeth I
Cultural depictions of Mary I of England
Cultural depictions of Edward VI of England
Cultural depictions of Henry VIII
Henry VII of England
Richard III of England
Edward IV of England
Henry VI of England
Cultural depictions of Henry V of England
Cultural depictions of Henry IV of England
Richard II of England
Edward III of England
Cultural depictions of Edward II of England
Cultural depictions of Edward I of England
Henry III of England
Cultural depictions of John, King of England
Cultural depictions of Richard I of England
Henry II of England
Stephen, King of England
Henry I of England
William II of England
Cultural depictions of William the Conqueror